

Events

Pre-1600
 285 (or 286) – Execution of Saints Crispin and Crispinian during the reign of Diocletian, now the patron saints of leather workers, curriers, and shoemakers.
 473 – Emperor Leo I acclaims his grandson Leo II as Caesar of the East Roman Empire.
1147 – Seljuk Turks defeat German crusaders under Conrad III at the Battle of Dorylaeum.
  1147   – Reconquista: After a siege of four months, crusader knights reconquer Lisbon.
1415 – Hundred Years' War: Henry V of England, with his lightly armoured infantry and archers, defeats the heavily armoured French cavalry in the Battle of Agincourt.

1601–1900
1616 – Dutch sea-captain Dirk Hartog makes the second recorded landfall by a European on Australian soil, at the later-named Dirk Hartog Island off the West Australian coast.
1747 – War of the Austrian Succession: A British fleet under Admiral Edward Hawke defeats the French at the Second Battle of Cape Finisterre.
1760 – King George III succeeds to the British throne on the death of his grandfather George II. 
1812 – War of 1812: The American frigate, commanded by Stephen Decatur, captures the British frigate .
1822 – Greek War of Independence: The First Siege of Missolonghi begins.
1854 – The Battle of Balaclava takes place during the Crimean War. It is soon memorialized in verse as The Charge of the Light Brigade.
1861 – The Toronto Stock Exchange is created.
1868 – The Uspenski Cathedral, designed by Aleksey Gornostayev, is inaugurated in Helsinki, Finland.
1900 – The United Kingdom annexes the Transvaal.

1901–present
1911 – The Xinhai Revolution spreads to Guangzhou, where the Qing general Feng-shan is assassinated by the Chinese Assassination Corps.
1917 – Old Style date of the October Revolution in Russia.
1920 – After 74 days on hunger strike in Brixton Prison, England, the Sinn Féin Lord Mayor of Cork, Terence MacSwiney dies.
1924 – The Zinoviev letter, which Zinoviev himself denied writing, is published in the Daily Mail; the Labour party would later blame this letter for the Conservatives' landslide election win four days later.
1927 – The Italian luxury liner SS Principessa Mafalda sinks off the coast of Brazil, killing 314. 
1932 – George Lansbury became the leader of the opposition British Labour Party.
1940 – Benjamin O. Davis Sr. is named the first African American general in the United States Army.
1944 – World War II: Heinrich Himmler orders a crackdown on the Edelweiss Pirates, a loosely organized youth culture in Nazi Germany that had assisted army deserters and others to hide from the Third Reich.
  1944   – World War II: The  under Richard O'Kane (the top American submarine ace of the war) is sunk by the ship's own malfunctioning torpedo.
  1944   – World War II: The final attempt of the Imperial Japanese Navy to win the war climaxes at the Battle of Leyte Gulf.
1945 – Fifty years of Japanese administration of Taiwan formally ends when the Republic of China assumes control.
1949 – The Battle of Guningtou in the Taiwan Strait begins.
1962 – Cuban Missile Crisis: Adlai Stevenson shows the United Nations Security Council reconnaissance photographs of Soviet ballistic missiles in Cuba.
1968 – A Fairchild F-27 crashes into Moose Mountain while on approach to Lebanon Municipal Airport in Lebanon, New Hampshire, killing 32 people.
1971 – The People's Republic of China replaces the Republic of China at the United Nations.
1973 – Egypt and Israel accept United Nations Security Council Resolution 339.
1980 – Proceedings on the Hague Convention on the Civil Aspects of International Child Abduction conclude.
1983 – The United States and its Caribbean allies invade Grenada, six days after Prime Minister Maurice Bishop and several of his supporters are executed in a coup d'état.
1995 – A commuter train slams into a school bus in Fox River Grove, Illinois, killing seven students.
1997 – After a civil war, Denis Sassou Nguesso proclaims himself President of the Republic of the Congo.
1999 – A Learjet 35 crashes in Mina near Aberdeen, South Dakota, killing all six people on board, including PGA golfer Payne Stewart.
2001 – Microsoft releases Windows XP, which becomes one of Microsoft's most successful operating systems.
2009 – The October 2009 Baghdad bombings kill 155 and wound at least 721.
2010 – Mount Merapi in Indonesia begins a month-long series of violent eruptions that kill 353 people and cause the evacuation of another 350,000 people.
2010 – A magnitude 7.8 earthquake strikes off Indonesia's Mentawai Islands, triggering a tsunami that kills at least 400 people.

Births

Pre-1600
 840 – Ya'qub ibn al-Layth al-Saffar, founder of the Saffarid dynasty (d. 879)
1102 – William Clito, French son of Sybilla of Conversano (d. 1128)
1330 – Louis II, Count of Flanders, (d. 1384)
1453 – Giuliano de' Medici (d. 1478)
1510 – Renée of France (d. 1574)
1574 – François de Sourdis, French Catholic prelate (d. 1628)
1589 – Jan Stanisław Sapieha, Polish-Lithuanian noble (d. 1635)

1601–1900
1612 – James Graham, 1st Marquess of Montrose, Scottish soldier (d. 1650)
1667 – Louis Frederick I, Prince of Schwarzburg-Rudolstadt (d. 1718)
1683 – Charles FitzRoy, 2nd Duke of Grafton, English-Irish politician, Lord Lieutenant of Ireland (d. 1757)
1692 – Elisabeth Farnese, Queen of Spain (d. 1766)
1709 – Georg Gebel, German organist and composer (d. 1753)
1714 – James Burnett, Lord Monboddo, Scottish judge (d. 1799)
1736 – Thomas Mullins, 1st Baron Ventry, Anglo-Irish politician and peer (d. 1824)
1743 – Friedrich Karl August, Prince of Waldeck and Pyrmont (d. 1812)
1749 – Erik Magnus Staël von Holstein, Swedish chamberlain (d. 1802)
1754 – Richard Howell, 3rd Governor of New Jersey (d. 1802)
1755 – François Joseph Lefebvre, French military commander (d. 1820)
1757 – Heinrich Friedrich Karl vom und zum Stein, Prussian statesman (d. 1831)
1759 – Maria Feodorovna, Russian wife of Paul I of Russia (d. 1828)
  1759   – William Grenville, English academic and politician, Prime Minister of the United Kingdom (d. 1834)
1760 – Arnold Hermann Ludwig Heeren, German historian (d. 1842)
1767 – Benjamin Constant, Swiss-French philosopher and politician (d. 1830)
1768 – Frederick William, ruler of Nassau-Weilburg (d. 1816)
1772 – Victoire de Donnissan de La Rochejaquelein, French memoirist (d. 1857)
  1772   – Géraud Duroc, French general and diplomat (d. 1813)
1779 – Pedro Velarde y Santillán, Spanish artillery captain (d. 1808)
1781 – Friedrich von Berchtold, Bohemian physician and botanist (d. 1876)
1782 – Levi Lincoln Jr., American lawyer and politician, 13th Governor of Massachusetts (d. 1868)
1789 – Carlos María de Alvear, Argentine soldier and statesman (d. 1852)
  1789   – Heinrich Schwabe, German astronomer (d. 1875)
1790 – Robert Stirling, Scottish clergyman and inventor (d. 1878)
1792 – Jeanne Jugan, French nun (d. 1879)
1795 – John P. Kennedy, American novelist and Whig politician (d. 1870)
1800 – Maria Jane Jewsbury, English writer, poet, literary reviewer (d. 1833)
  1800   – Thomas Babington Macaulay, English poet, historian, and politician, Secretary at War (d. 1859)
  1800   – Jacques Paul Migne, French priest (d. 1875)
  1800   – Julius von Mohl, German orientalist (d. 1876)
1802 – Richard Parkes Bonington, English painter (d. 1828)
  1802   – Joseph Montferrand, Canadian logger and strongman (d. 1864)
1803 – Maria Doolaeghe, Flemish novelist (d. 1884)
1806 – Max Stirner, German philosopher and author (d. 1856)
1811 – Évariste Galois, French mathematician and theorist (d. 1832)
1814 – Prince Louis, Duke of Nemours (d. 1896)
1815 – Camillo Sivori, Italian virtuoso violinist and composer (d. 1894)
1819 – Christian August Friedrich Garcke, German botanist (d. 1904)
1821 – Antonio Ciseri, Swiss-Italian painter (d. 1891)
1825 – Johann Strauss II, Austrian composer and educator (d. 1899)
  1825   – Johann Friedrich Julius Schmidt, German astronomer and geophysicist (d. 1884)
1827 – Marcellin Berthelot, French chemist and politician (d. 1907)
1832 – Grand Duke Michael Nikolaevich of Russia (d. 1909)
1838 – Georges Bizet, French pianist and composer (d. 1875)
  1838   – James Maybrick, English cotton merchant, victim of the "Aigburth Poisoning" (d. 1889)
1844 – Philip Wicksteed, English economist (d. 1927)
1848 – Carlo Emery, Italian entomologist (d. 1925)
  1848   – Karl Emil Franzos, Austrian novelist (d. 1904)
1852 – Dmitry Mamin-Sibiryak, Russian author (d. 1912)
1853 – Karl August Otto Hoffmann, German botanist (d. 1909)
1856 – Dragutin Gorjanović-Kramberger, Croatian geologist, paleontologist, and archaeologist (d. 1936)
1858 – Take Ionescu, Romanian politician, diplomat, journalist and lawyer (d. 1922)
1864 – John Francis Dodge, American businessman, co-founded the Dodge Company (d. 1920)
  1864   – Alexander Gretchaninov, Russian-American pianist and composer (d. 1956)
  1864   – Toktogul Satylganov, Kyrgyz Akyn, poet and singer (d. 1933)
1866 – Thomas Armat, American mechanic and inventor (d. 1948)
  1866   – Norbert Klein, Bishop of Brno (d. 1933)
  1866   – Georg Schumann, German composer (d. 1952)
1867 – Józef Dowbor-Muśnicki, Polish general (d. 1937)
1868 – Dan Burke, American baseball player (d. 1933)
  1868   – Oskar Kallas, Estonian linguist and diplomat (d. 1946)
1874 – Emma Gramatica, Italian actress (d. 1965)
  1874   – Victor Sonnemans, Belgian water polo player (d. 1962)
  1874   – Huang Xing, Chinese revolutionary leader and statesman (d. 1916)
1875 – Carolyn Sherwin Bailey, American author and educator (d. 1961)
  1875   – Arthur Birkett, British cricketer (d. 1941)
1877 – Adolf Moller, German rower (d. 1968)
  1877   – Henry Norris Russell, American astronomer (d. 1957)
1879 – Fritz Haarmann, German serial killer (d. 1925)
1880 – Bohumír Šmeral, Czech politician (d. 1941)
1881 – Pablo Picasso, Spanish painter and sculptor (d. 1973)
1882 – John T. Flynn, American journalist and author (d. 1964)
  1882   – Tony Jackson, American singer-songwriter and pianist (d. 1921)
  1882   – André-Damien-Ferdinand Jullien, French Cardinal of the Roman Catholic Church (d. 1964)
  1882   – Theodora Agnes Peck, American author and poet (d. 1964)
1883 – Nikolay Krestinsky, Russian revolutionary and politician (d. 1938)
1884 – Maria Czaplicka, Polish cultural anthropologist (d. 1921)
1885 – Sam M. Lewis, American singer and lyricist (d. 1959)
  1885   – Xavier Lesage, French equestrian (d. 1968)
1886 – Leo G. Carroll, English-American actor (d. 1972)
  1886   – Karl Polanyi, Austro-Hungarian economist and historian (d. 1964)
1887 – Alexander McCulloch, British rower (d. 1951)
1888 – Richard E. Byrd, American admiral and pilot (d. 1957)
  1888   – Nils Dardel, Swedish-American painter (d. 1943)
  1888   – Jan Palouš, Czechoslovak ice hockey player (d. 1971)
  1888   – Léon Tom, Belgian fencer and bobsledder
1889 – Abel Gance, French actor, director, producer, and screenwriter (d. 1981)
1890 – Floyd Bennett, American aviator (d. 1928)
  1890   – Kōtarō Tanaka, Japanese jurist and politician (d. 1974)
1891 – Charles Coughlin, Canadian-American priest and radio host (d. 1979)
  1891   – Karl Elmendorff, German conductor (d. 1962)
1892 – Nell Shipman, Canadian-American actress, screenwriter, and producer (d. 1970)
1894 – Claude Cahun, French photographer and sculptor (d. 1954)
  1894   – Âşık Veysel Şatıroğlu, Turkish poet and songwriter (d. 1973)
  1894   – Johan Wilhelm Rangell, Prime Minister of Finland (d. 1982)
1895 – Levi Eshkol, Ukrainian-Israeli soldier and politician, 3rd Prime Minister of Israel (d. 1969)
  1895   – Vsevolod Merkulov, Russian head of the NKGB (d. 1953)
  1895   – Arthur Schmidt, German officer (d. 1987)
1896 – Nils Backlund, Swedish water polo player (d. 1964)
1897 – Erwin von Lahousen, German Abwehr official (d. 1955)
  1897   – Karl Olivecrona, Swedish lawyer and philosopher (d. 1980)
  1897   – Luigi Pavese, Italian actor (d. 1969)
1898 – Karl Anton, German director, screenwriter and producer (d. 1979)
1899 – Armand Thirard, French cinematographer (d. 1973) 
1900 – Johan Greter, Dutch equestrian (d. 1975)
  1900   – Funmilayo Ransome-Kuti, Nigerian educator and activist (d. 1978)
  1900   – William Stevenson, American track and fielder (d. 1985)

1901–present
1901 – Roy Fox, British dance bandleader (d. 1982)

1902 – Henry Steele Commager, American historian and author (d. 1998)
  1902   – Carlo Gnocchi, Italian priest, educator and writer (d. 1956)
  1902   – Eddie Lang, American jazz guitarist (d. 1933)
1903 – Piet van der Horst, Dutch cyclist (d. 1983)
1904 – Cemal Reşit Rey, Turkish pianist, composer, and conductor (d. 1985)
  1904   – Denny Shute, American golfer (d. 1974)
  1904   – Bill Tytla, Ukrainian-American animator (d. 1968)
1905 – Bob McPhail, Scottish footballer (d. 2000)
1906 – Karl Humenberger, Austrian footballer (d. 1989)
1908 – Carmen Dillon, English film and production designer (d. 2000)
  1908   – Gotthard Handrick, German fighter pilot and Olympic athlete (d. 1978)
  1908   – Polly Ann Young, American actress (d. 1997)
1909 – Whit Bissell, American actor (d. 1996)
  1909   – Jean-Paul Le Chanois, French actor, director and screenwriter (d. 1985)
  1909   – Ken Domon, Japanese photographer (d. 1990)
  1909   – Edward Flynn, American boxer (d. 1976)
1910 – William Higinbotham, American physicist and video game designer (d. 1994)
  1910   – Johnny Mauro, American race car driver (d. 2003)
  1910   – Tyrus Wong, Chinese-American artist (d. 2016)
1912 – Abdelkader Ben Bouali, French footballer (d. 1997)
  1912   – Alfred Klingler, German field handballer
  1912   – Minnie Pearl, American entertainer and philanthropist (d. 1996)
  1912   – Luigi Raimondi, Cardinal of the Roman Catholic Church (d. 1975)
1913 – Klaus Barbie, German SS captain (d. 1991)
  1913   – Anton Kochinyan, Soviet-Armenian politician (d. 1990)
1914 – John Berryman, American poet and scholar (d. 1972)
1915 – Ivan M. Niven, Canadian-American mathematician and academic (d. 1999)
1916 – Helge Larsson, Swedish canoeist (d. 1971)
1917 – Carl Forssell, Swedish fencer (d. 2005)
  1917   – Dmitry Polyansky, First Deputy Premier of the Soviet Union (d. 2001)
1918 – David Ausubel, American psychologist (d. 2008)
1919 – Beate Uhse-Rotermund, German pilot and entrepreneur (d. 2001)
  1919   – Raoul Remy, French cyclist (d. 2002)
1920 – Megan Taylor, British figure skater (d. 1993)
1921 – Michael I of Romania (d. 2017)
1922 – Gloria Lasso, Spanish singer (d. 2005)
1923 – Achille Silvestrini, Italian prelate (d. 2019)
  1923   – Beate Sirota Gordon, Austrian-American director and producer (d. 2012)
  1923   – Bobby Thomson, Scottish-American baseball player (d. 2010)
1924 – Billy Barty, American actor (d. 2000)
  1924   – Earl Palmer, American Hall of Fame drummer (d. 2008)
1925 – Oralia Dominguez, Mexican operatic mezzo-soprano singer (d. 2013)
  1925   – Joseph Michel, Belgian politician (d. 2016)
1926 – Bo Carpelan, Finnish poet and author (d. 2011)
  1926   – Jimmy Heath, American saxophonist and composer (d. 2020)
  1926   – Galina Vishnevskaya, Russian-American soprano and actress (d. 2012)
1927 – Barbara Cook, American singer and actress (d. 2017)
  1927   – Jorge Batlle Ibáñez, Uruguayan lawyer and politician, 32nd President of Uruguay (d. 2016)
  1927   – Lawrence Kohlberg, American psychologist and author (d. 1987)
  1927   – Lauretta Masiero, Italian actress and singer (d. 2010)
1928 – Jeanne Cooper, American actress (d. 2013)
  1928   – Paulo Mendes da Rocha, Brazilian architect (d. 2021)
  1928   – Anthony Franciosa, American actor (d. 2006)
  1928   – Adolphe Gesché, Belgian Catholic priest and theologian (d. 2003)
  1928   – Peter Naur, Danish computer scientist, astronomer, and academic (d. 2016)
  1928   – Marion Ross, American actress
  1928   – Yakov Rylsky, Soviet Jewish sabre fencer (d. 1999)
1929 – Michel Knuysen, Belgian rower (d. 2013)
  1929   – Zdravko Milev, Bulgarian chess player (d. 1984)
  1929   – Claude Rouer, French cyclist (d. 2021)
  1929   – Peter Rühmkorf, German writer (d. 2008)
1930 – Harold Brodkey, American author and academic (d. 1996)
  1930   – Karoly Honfi, Hungarian chess player (d. 1996)
1931 – Annie Girardot, French actress and singer (d. 2011)
  1931   – Jimmy McIlroy, Northern Irish footballer and manager (d. 2018)
1932 – Vitold Fokin, Ukrainian first deputy prime minister
  1932   – Jerzy Pawłowski, Polish fencer and double agent (d. 2005)
  1932   – Theodor Pištěk, Czech costume designer
1933 – René Brodmann, Swiss footballer (d. 2000)
  1933   – Martti Mansikka, Finnish gymnast
1934 – Carlos Sherman, Belarusian–Spanish translator, writer, activist (d. 2005)
1935 – Rusty Schweickart, American soldier, pilot, and astronaut
1936 – Martin Gilbert, English historian, author, and academic (d. 2015)
  1936   – Arnfinn Nesset, Norwegian nurse and convicted serial killer
  1936   – Masako Nozawa, Japanese actress and singer
1937 – Vendramino Bariviera, Italian cyclist (d. 2001)
  1937   – Ignacio Carrasco de Paula, Spanish prelate
  1937   – Roberto Menescal, Brazilian singer-songwriter, guitarist, and producer
1938 – Bob Webster, American diver
1939 – Zelmo Beaty, American basketball player and coach (d. 2013)
  1939   – Sara Dylan, American actress and model
  1939   – Nikolay Kiselyov, Soviet Nordic combined athlete (d. 2005)
  1939   – Nikos Nikolaidis, Greek director, producer, and screenwriter (d. 2007)
  1939   – Dave Simmonds, British motorcycle racer (d. 1972)
  1939   – Robin Spry, Canadian director, producer, and screenwriter (d. 2005)
1940 – Jimmy Herman, Canadian actor (d. 2013)
  1940   – Bob Knight, American basketball player and coach
1941 – Lynda Benglis, American sculptor and painter
  1941   – Helen Reddy, Australian-American singer-songwriter and actress (d. 2020)
  1941   – Gordon Tootoosis, Aboriginal Canadian actor (d. 2011)
  1941   – Anne Tyler, American author and critic
  1941   – Dave Weill, American discus thrower
1942 – Terumasa Hino, Japanese jazz trumpeter
  1942   – Gloria Katz, American screenwriter and producer (d. 2018)
  1942   – Franklin Loufrani, French President of the Smiley Company
1943 – Orso Maria Guerrini, Italian actor
1944 – Azizan Abdul Razak, Malaysian politician, 10th Menteri Besar of Kedah (d. 2013)
  1944   – Jon Anderson, English singer-songwriter and guitarist
  1944   – James Carville, American lawyer and political consultant
  1944   – Donald Ford, Scottish footballer
  1944   – Fred Housego, Scottish-English taxi driver and game show host
  1944   – Kati Kovács, Hungarian singer-songwriter and actress
  1944   – Ren Zhengfei, Chinese businessman
1945 – Peter Ledger, Australian-American painter and illustrator (d. 1994)
  1945   – Roy Lynes, English keyboardist and singer
  1945   – Yuriy Meshkov, Ukrainian politician and Russian separatist (d. 2019)
  1945   – Phil "Fang" Volk, American musician, singer-songwriter, and record producer
  1945   – Krzysztof Piesiewicz, Polish lawyer, screenwriter and politician
  1945   – Francisco Sá, Argentine footballer
  1945   – David S. Ward, American director and screenwriter
  1945   – Keaton Yamada, Japanese voice actor
1946 – Yazzie Johnson, Navajo artist
  1946   – Elías Figueroa, Chilean footballer
  1946   – Peter Lieberson, American composer
1947 – Requena Nozal, Spanish artist
  1947   – Glenn Tipton, English singer-songwriter and guitarist 
1948 – Dave Cowens, American basketball player and coach
  1948   – Dan Gable, American wrestler and coach
  1948   – Dan Issel, American basketball player and coach
  1948   – Sigleif Johansen, Norwegian biathlete
1949 – Réjean Houle, Canadian ice hockey player and manager
  1949   – Walter Hyatt, American singer-songwriter (d. 1996)
  1949   – Brian Kerwin, American actor
  1949   – Wilfried Louis, Haitian footballer
1950 – Anne Alvaro, French actress
  1950   – Fernando Arêas Rifan, Brazilian bishop
  1950   – Roger Davies, English footballer
  1950   – John Matuszak, American footballer (d. 1989)
  1950   – Francisco Oscar Lamolina, Argentine football referee
  1950   – Chris Norman, English singer-songwriter 
1951 – Richard Lloyd, American singer-songwriter and guitarist 
1952 – Samir Geagea, Lebanese commander and politician
  1952   – Wendy Hall, English computer scientist, mathematician, and academic
  1952   – Ioannis Kyrastas, Greek footballer and manager (d. 2004)
  1952   – Tove Nilsen, Norwegian author
1953 – Daniele Bagnoli, Italian volleyball coach
  1953   – Jasem Yaqoub, Kuwaiti footballer
1954 – Mike Eruzione, American ice hockey player and coach
  1954   – Ed Powers, American founder of Ed Powers Productions
1955 – Glynis Barber, South African-English actress
  1955   – Robin Eubanks, American trombonist and educator
  1955   – Gale Anne Hurd, American producer
  1955   – Matthias Jabs, German guitarist and songwriter
  1955   – Leena Lander, Finnish author
  1955   – Lito Lapid, Filipino actor
1956 – Stephen Leather, British author
1957 – Nancy Cartwright, American voice actress
  1957   – Enrique López Zarza, Mexican footballer
  1957   – Robbie McIntosh, English guitarist
  1957   – Piet Wildschut, Dutch footballer
1958 – Kornelia Ender, East German swimmer
  1958   – Kjell Inge Røkke, Norwegian businessman and philanthropist
1959 – Óscar Aguirregaray, Uruguayan footballer
  1959   – Chrissy Amphlett, Australian singer-songwriter and actress (d. 2013)
1960 – Hong Sang-soo, South Korean director and screenwriter
1961 – John Sivebæk, Danish footballer
  1961   – Chad Smith, American drummer
1962 – David Furnish, Canadian filmmaker
  1962   – Steve Gainer, American cinematographer and director
  1962   – Steve Hodge, English footballer and manager
  1962   – John Stollmeyer, American soccer player
1963 – John Levén, Swedish bass player and songwriter
  1963   – Michael Lynagh, Australian rugby union footballer
  1963   – Melinda McGraw, American actress
  1963   – José Ortiz, Puerto Rican basketball player
  1963   – Tracy Nelson, American actress
1964 – Michael Boatman, American actor
  1964   – Johan de Kock, Dutch footballer
  1964   – Nicole, German singer
  1964   – Kevin Michael Richardson, American voice actor and singer
1965 – 2 Cold Scorpio, American wrestler
  1965   – Mathieu Amalric, French actor and director
  1965   – Valdir Benedito, Brazilian footballer
  1965   – Claire Colebrook, Australian philosopher, theorist, and academic
  1965   – Dominique Herr, Swiss footballer
  1965   – Derrick Rostagno, American tennis player
  1965   – Rainer Strecker, German actor
1966 – Zana Briski, British photographer and filmmaker
  1966   – Lionel Charbonnier, French footballer
  1966   – Wendel Clark, Canadian ice hockey player
  1966   – Perry Saturn, American wrestler
1967 – Martin Marinov, Australian canoeist
  1967   – Taiyō Matsumoto, Japanese manga artist
  1967   – Gary Sundgren, Swedish footballer 
1968 – Doris Fitschen, German footballer
  1968   – Speech, American rapper
1969 – Samantha Bee, Canadian-American comedian and television host 
  1969   – Josef Beránek, Czech ice hockey player and coach
  1969   – Slavko Cicak, Swedish chess Grandmaster
  1969   – Nika Futterman, American voice actress, comedian and singer
  1969   – Ibragim Gasanbekov, Azerbaijani footballer
  1969   – Oleg Salenko, Russian footballer
  1969   – Alex Webster, American bass player 
1970 – J. A. Adande, American journalist and academic
  1970   – Peter Aerts, Dutch kick-boxer and mixed martial artist
  1970   – Adam Goldberg, American actor, director, producer, and screenwriter
  1970   – Damir Mršić, Bosnian basketball player
  1970   – Adam Pascal, American actor and singer
  1970   – Rafael González Robles, Spanish footballer
  1970   – Ed Robertson, Canadian singer-songwriter, guitarist, and producer 
  1970   – Daniel Scheinhardt, German footballer
  1970   – Chely Wright, American singer-songwriter and actress
1971 – Simon Charlton, English footballer and manager
  1971   – Athena Chu, Hong Kong actress and singer
  1971   – Neil Fallon, American singer-songwriter and guitarist
  1971   – Midori Gotō, Japanese-American violinist and educator
  1971   – Leslie Grossman, American actress 
  1971   – Rosie Ledet, American singer-songwriter and accordion player
  1971   – Pedro Martínez, Dominican-American baseball player and sportscaster
  1971   – Craig Robinson, American actor and singer
  1971   – Elif Şafak, French-Turkish journalist, author, and academic
1972 – Cristian Dulca, Romanian footballer
  1972   – Rodolfo Falcón, Cuban swimmer
  1972   – Maxi Mounds, American nude big-bust model and pornographic actress
  1972   – Jonathan Torrens, Canadian actor, producer, and screenwriter
  1972   – Persia White, American actress
1973 – Fırat Aydınus, Turkish football referee
  1973   – Lamont Bentley, American actor and rapper (d. 2005)
  1973   – Michael Weston, American actor
1974 – Lee Byung-kyu, South Korean baseball player
  1974   – Yoo Yong-sung, South Korean badminton player
1975 – Eirik Glambek Bøe, Norwegian singer-songwriter and guitarist
  1975   – Ryan Clement, American football player
  1975   – Agustín Julio, Colombian footballer
  1975   – Zadie Smith,  English author and academic
  1975   – Antony Starr, New Zealand actor
1976 – Deon Burton, Jamaican footballer
  1976   – Ahmed Dokhi, Saudi Arabian footballer
  1976   – Akihisa Ikeda, Japanese manga artist
  1976   – Steve Jones, Northern Irish footballer
  1976   – Brett Kirk, Australian footballer and coach
  1976   – Anton Sikharulidze, Russian pair skater
1977 – The Alchemist, American rapper, DJ, and producer 
  1977   – Yeho, Israeli singer and actor
  1977   – Rodolfo Bodipo, Equatoguinean retired footballer
  1977   – Mitică Pricop, Romanian sprint canoer
  1977   – Birgit Prinz, German footballer and psychologist
  1977   – Rakan Rushaidat, Croatian actor
  1977   – Kateryna Serebrianska, Ukrainian gymnast
  1977   – Mihai Tararache, Romanian footballer
1978 – Russell Anderson, Scottish footballer
  1978   – Zachary Knighton, American actor
  1978   – Bobby Madden, Scottish football referee
  1978   – Robert Mambo Mumba, Kenyan footballer
  1978   – Markus Pöyhönen, Finnish sprinter
  1978   – An Yong-hak, North Korean footballer
1979 – Bat for Lashes, English singer
  1979   – Rob Hulse, English footballer
  1979   – Mariana Klaveno, American actress
  1979   – João Lucas, Portuguese footballer (d. 2015)
  1979   – Rosa Mendes, Canadian-American wrestler and model
1980 – Mehcad Brooks, American model and actor
  1980   – Félicien Singbo, Beninois footballer
1981 – Hiroshi Aoyama, Japanese motorcycle racer
  1981   – Josh Henderson, American actor and singer
  1981   – Shaun Wright-Phillips, English footballer
1982 – Victoria Francés, Spanish illustrator
  1982   – Devin Green, American basketball player
  1982   – Guido Grünheid, German basketball player
  1982   – Camilla Jensen, Danish curler
  1982   – Michael Sweetney, American basketball player
  1982   – Mickaël Tavares, Senegalese footballer
1983 – Princess Yōko of Mikasa
  1983   – Hotaru Akane, Japanese actress and activist
  1983   – Stanislav Bohush, Ukrainian footballer
  1983   – Daniele Mannini, Italian footballer
  1983   – Han Yeo-reum, South Korean actress
1984 – Nicolas Besch, French ice hockey player
  1984   – Ticia Gara, Hungarian chess player
  1984   – Sara Lumholdt, Swedish singer and dancer 
  1984   – Katy Perry, American singer-songwriter and actress
  1984   – Iván Ramis, Spanish footballer
  1984   – Karolina Šprem, Croatian tennis player
1985 – Ciara, American singer-songwriter, dancer, and actress
  1985   – Óscar Granados, Costa Rican footballer
  1985   – Kara Lynn Joyce, American swimmer
  1985   – Daniele Padelli, Italian footballer
1986 – Tweety Carter, American basketball player
  1986   – Roger Espinoza, Honduran footballer
  1986   – Eddie Gaven, American soccer player
  1986   – Kristian Sarkies, Australian footballer
  1986   – Ekaterina Shumilova, Russian biathlete
1987 – Bill Amis, American basketball player
  1987   – Darron Gibson, Irish footballer
  1987   – Fabian Hambüchen, German gymnast
1988 – Robson Conceição, Brazilian boxer
  1988   – Lewis McGugan, English professional footballer
  1988   – Chandler Parsons, American basketball player
  1988   – Kaz Patafta, Australian footballer
  1988   – Karim Yoda, French footballer
1989 – Filip Grgić, Croatian taekwondo practitioner
  1989   – Sten Grytebust, Norwegian footballer
  1989   – David Hala, Australian rugby league player
  1989   – Ivan Marconi, Italian footballer
1990 – Mattia Cattaneo, Italian cyclist
  1990   – Sara Chafak, Finnish beauty pageant winner
  1990   – Asha Philip, British athlete
  1990   – Milena Rašić, Serbian volleyball player
  1990   – Dzina Sazanavets, Belarusian weightlifter
1991 – Davide Faraoni, Italian footballer
  1991   – Isabella Shinikova, Bulgarian tennis player
1992 – Clarisse Agbegnenou, French judoka
  1992   – Davide Formolo, Italian cyclist
  1992   – Sergey Ridzik, Russian freestyle skier
1993 – Isaiah Austin, American basketball player
  1993   – Iván Garcia, Mexican diver
1994 – Richard Jouve, French cross-country skier
  1994   – Jefferson Lerma, Colombian footballer
  1994   – Matteo Lodo, Italian rower
  1994   – Gor Minasyan, Armenian weightlifter
  1994   – Ray Robson, American chess Grandmaster
1995 – Conchita Campbell, Canadian actress
  1995   – Patrick McCaw, American basketball player
1997 – Federico Chiesa, Italian footballer
1998 – Juan Soto, Dominican baseball player
2000 – Vincent Zhou, American figure skater
2001 – Princess Elisabeth, Belgian princess

Deaths

Pre-1600
 625 – Pope Boniface V
 912 – Rudolph I, king of Burgundy (b. 859)
1047 – Magnus the Good, Norwegian king (b. 1024)
1053 – Enguerrand II, Count of Ponthieu
1154 – Stephen, King of England
1180 – John of Salisbury, French bishop (b. c. 1120)
1200 – Conrad of Wittelsbach, German cardinal (b. 1120)
1230 – Gilbert de Clare, 5th Earl of Gloucester, English soldier (b. 1180)
1292 – Robert Burnell, Lord Chancellor of England
1349 – James III of Majorca (b. 1315)
1359 – Beatrice of Castile, queen consort of Portugal (b. 1293)
1400 – Geoffrey Chaucer, English philosopher, poet, and author (b. c.1343)
1415 – Charles I of Albret
  1415   – Philip II, Count of Nevers (b. 1389)
  1415   – Frederick I, Count of Vaudémont (b. 1371)
  1415   – Jean I, Duke of Alençon (b. 1385)
  1415   – Anthony, Duke of Brabant (b. 1384)
  1415   – Michael de la Pole, 3rd Earl of Suffolk, English soldier (b. 1394)
  1415   – Edward of Norwich, 2nd Duke of York, English politician (b. 1373)
  1415   – Dafydd Gam, Welsh nobleman (b. c. 1380)
1478 – Catherine of Bosnia (b. 1425)
1492 – Thaddeus McCarthy, Irish bishop (b. 1455)
1495 – John II of Portugal (b. 1455)
1514 – William Elphinstone, Scottish bishop and academic, founded University of Aberdeen (b. 1431)
1557 – William Cavendish, English courtier and civil servant (b. 1505)

1601–1900
1647 – Evangelista Torricelli, Italian physicist and mathematician (b. 1608)
1651 – Saint Job of Pochayiv, Ukrainian Orthodox Christian saint (b. 1551)
1683 – William Scroggs, English judge and politician, Lord Chief Justice of England and Wales (b. 1623)
1733 – Giovanni Girolamo Saccheri, Italian priest, mathematician, and philosopher (b. 1667)
1757 – Antoine Augustin Calmet, French monk and theologian (b. 1672)
1760 – George II of Great Britain (b. 1683)
1806 – Henry Knox, American general and politician, 2nd United States Secretary of War (b. 1750)
1826 – Philippe Pinel, French physician and psychiatrist (b. 1745)
1833 – Abbas Mirza, Persian prince (b. 1789)
1852 – John C. Clark, American lawyer and politician (b. 1793)
1889 – Émile Augier, French playwright (b. 1820)
1895 – Charles Hallé, German-English pianist and conductor (b. 1819)

1901–present
1902 – Frank Norris, American journalist and novelist (b. 1870)
1910 – Willie Anderson, Scottish-American golfer (b. 1878)
1916 – William Merritt Chase, American painter and educator (b. 1849)
1919 – William Kidston, Scottish-Australian politician, 17th Premier of Queensland (b. 1849)
1920 – Alexander of Greece (b. 1893)
  1920   – Terence MacSwiney, Irish playwright, politician, Lord Mayor of Cork and hunger striker (b. 1879)
1920 – Joe Murphy (Irish republican) died during the 1920 Cork hunger strike 
1921 – Bat Masterson, American lawman, buffalo hunter, and sport writer (b. 1853)
1924 – Ziya Gökalp, Turkish sociologist, poet, and activist (b. 1876)
1938 – Alfonsina Storni, Swiss-Argentinian poet and author (b. 1892)
1940 – Thomas Waddell, Irish-Australian politician, 15th Premier of New South Wales (b. 1854)
1941 – Franz von Werra, Swiss-German captain and pilot (b. 1914)
1945 – Robert Ley, German politician (b. 1890)
1949 – Mary Ackworth Orr Evershed, English astronomer and Dante scholar (b. 1867)
1953 – Holger Pedersen, Danish linguist and academic (b. 1867)
1954 – Purshottam Narayan Gadgil, Indian jeweller and namesake of P. N. Gadgil Jewellers (b. 1874)
1955 – Sadako Sasaki, Japanese girl (b. 1943)
1956 – Risto Ryti, Finnish lawyer, politician and Governor of the Bank of Finland; 5th President of Finland (b. 1889)
1957 – Albert Anastasia, Italian-American mob boss (b. 1902)
  1957   – Edward Plunkett, 18th Baron of Dunsany, English-Irish author, poet, and playwright (b. 1878)
1960 – Harry Ferguson, Irish-English engineer, founded the Ferguson Company (b. 1884)
1963 – Roger Désormière, French conductor and composer (b. 1898)
1967 – Margaret Ayer Barnes, American author and playwright (b. 1886)
1969 – Ellinor Aiki, Estonian painter (b. 1893) 
1970 – Ülo Sooster, Estonian painter (b. 1924)
1971 – Mikhail Yangel, Soviet missile designer (b. 1911)
1972 – Johnny Mantz, American race car driver (b. 1918)
1973 – Abebe Bikila, Ethiopian runner (b. 1932)
  1973   – Cleo Moore, American actress (b. 1928)
  1973   – Robert Scholl, German accountant and politician (b. 1891)
1975 – Vladimir Herzog, Brazilian journalist and activist (b. 1937)
1976 – Raymond Queneau, French poet and author (b. 1903)
1977 – Félix Gouin, French politician (b. 1884)
1979 – Gerald Templer, English field marshal and politician, British High Commissioner in Malaya (b. 1898)
1980 – Virgil Fox, American organist and educator (b. 1912)
  1980   – Víctor Galíndez, Argentine boxer (b. 1948)
  1980   – Sahir Ludhianvi, Indian poet and songwriter (b. 1921)
1982 – Bill Eckersley, English footballer (b. 1925)
  1982   – Arvid Wallman, Swedish diver (b. 1901)
1985 – Gary Holton, English singer-songwriter (b. 1952)
1986 – Forrest Tucker, American actor (b. 1919)
1989 – Mary McCarthy, American novelist and critic (b. 1912)
1990 – Alberto da Costa Pereira, Portuguese footballer (b. 1929)
1991 – Bill Graham, German-American concert promoter (b. 1931)
1992 – Roger Miller, American singer-songwriter and actor (b. 1936)
  1992   – Richard Pousette-Dart, American painter and educator (b. 1916)
1993 – Danny Chan, Hong Kong singer-songwriter, producer, and actor (b. 1958)
  1993   – Vincent Price, American actor (b. 1911)
1994 – Kara Hultgreen, American lieutenant and pilot (b. 1965)
  1994   – Mildred Natwick, American actress (b. 1905)
1995 – Viveca Lindfors, Swedish actress (b. 1920)
  1995   – Bobby Riggs, American tennis player (b. 1918)
1999 – Leonard Boyle, Irish and Canadian palaeographer and medievalist (b. 1923) 
  1999   – Payne Stewart, American golfer (b. 1957)
2000 – Mochitsura Hashimoto, Japanese commander (b. 1909)
2002 – Richard Harris, Irish actor and singer (b. 1930)
  2002   – René Thom, French mathematician and biologist (b. 1923)
  2002   – Paul Wellstone, American academic and politician (b. 1944)
2003 – Pandurang Shastri Athavale, Indian spiritual leader and philosopher (b. 1920)
  2003   – Veikko Hakulinen, Finnish skier and technician (b. 1925)
2004 – John Peel, English radio host and producer (b. 1939)
2010 – Lisa Blount, American actress (b. 1957)
  2010   – Gregory Isaacs, Jamaican-English singer-songwriter (b. 1951)
  2010   – Vesna Parun, Croatian poet and author (b. 1922)
2012 – Jacques Barzun, French-American historian and author (b. 1907)
  2012   – Jaspal Bhatti, Indian actor, director, producer, and screenwriter (b. 1955)
  2012   – John Connelly, English footballer (b. 1938)
  2012   – Emanuel Steward, American boxer, trainer, and sportscaster (b. 1944)
2013 – Ron Ackland, New Zealand rugby player and coach (b. 1934)
  2013   – Arthur Danto, American philosopher and critic (b. 1924)
  2013   – Nicholas Hunt, Welsh-English admiral (b. 1930)
  2013   – Hal Needham, American actor, stuntman, director, and screenwriter (b. 1931)
  2013   – Paul Reichmann, Austrian-Canadian businessman, founded Olympia and York (b. 1930)
  2013   – Bill Sharman, American basketball player and coach (b. 1926)
  2013   – Marcia Wallace, American actress and comedian (b. 1942)
2014 – Jack Bruce, Scottish-English singer-songwriter and bass player (b. 1943)
  2014   – Carlos Morales Troncoso, Dominican lawyer and politician, 34th Vice President of the Dominican Republic (b. 1940)
2015 – David Cesarani, English historian and author (b. 1956)
  2015   – Lisa Jardine, English historian, author, and academic (b. 1944)
  2015   – Cecil Lolo, South African footballer (b. 1988)
  2015   – Flip Saunders, American basketball player and coach (b. 1955)
2016 – Carlos Alberto Torres, Brazilian football player and manager (b. 1944)
  2016   – Bob Hoover, USAF, Test, and Airshow pilot (b. 1922)
2018 – Thomas Keating, an American Trappist monk and a principal developer of Centering Prayer (b. 1923)
2019 – Dilip Parikh, Indian politician (b. 1937)

Holidays and observances
Armed Forces Day (Romania)
Christian feast day:
Bernat Calbó (Bernard of Calvo)
Pope Boniface I
Canna
Blessed Carlo Gnocchi
Crysanthus and Daria (Western Christianity)
Crispin and Crispinian
Fructus
Gaudentius of Brescia
Goeznovius
Minias of Florence
Mar Nestorius (in the Nestorian churches)
Tabitha (Dorcas)
Tegulus
Blessed Thaddeus McCarthy
The Six Welsh Martyrs and companions (in Wales)
The Hallowing of Nestorius
October 25 (Eastern Orthodox liturgics)
Earliest day on which Nevada Day can fall, while October 31 is the latest; celebrated on last Friday in October. (Nevada)
Earliest day on which October Holiday can fall, while October 31 is the latest; observed on last Monday in October. (Ireland)
Earliest day on which Teacher's Day (Australia) can fall, while October 31 is the latest; celebrated on last Friday in October. (Australia)
Customs Officer's Day (Russia) 
Day of the Basque Country (Basque Country)
Retrocession Day (Taiwan)
Sovereignty Day (Slovenia)
Thanksgiving Day (Grenada)

References

External links

 
 
 

Days of the year
October